Jacob Whiteduck-Lavoie is a Canadian actor from Quebec. He is most noted for his performance in the film A Colony (Une colonie), for which he received a Canadian Screen Award nomination for Best Supporting Actor at the 7th Canadian Screen Awards in 2019 and a Prix Iris nomination for Revelation of the Year at the 21st Quebec Cinema Awards.

He is a member of the Kitigan Zibi Anishinabeg First Nation.

He has also appeared in the film Bootlegger, the short films Screw the Boys and The Music Video, the television series District 31 and the television miniseries Eaux turbulentes.

References

External links

Canadian male film actors
Canadian male television actors
Canadian male child actors
Male actors from Quebec
First Nations male actors
Living people
Year of birth missing (living people)
Algonquin people
People from Outaouais